Mohammad Yousaf (Urdu: محمد یوسف) is a Pakistani politician and Member of Senate of Pakistan, serving as Chairperson-Senate Committee on Petroleum and Resources.

Political career
He belongs to Baluchistan province of Pakistan, and was elected to the Senate in March 2012 on a general seat as Pakistan Peoples Party candidate. He is the chairperson of Senate Committee on Petroleum and Natural Resources and member of senate committees of Interior and Narcotics Control, National Food Security and Research, Inter-Provincial Coordination.

See also
 List of Senators of Pakistan
 List of committees of the Senate of Pakistan

References

External links
Senate of Pakistan Official Website
Pakistan Peoples Party Official Website

Living people
Pakistani senators (14th Parliament)
Pakistan People's Party politicians
Year of birth missing (living people)